Hannah Cowley  (born 5 November 1981) is an English actress and director.

Early life and education 
Cowley was born and raised in Islington, London, the great grand-niece of Charles Cowley. While studying ballet at the London Studio Centre of Dance, she gained fame as a child model and filmed over 30 commercials. Cowley attended Prior Weston Primary School before moving to Australia. She graduated from the University of Sydney with honours I in history, then accepted a place in the PhD program at University of New South Wales.

Career 
Cowley performed with the London Studio Centre of Dance in the ballets Carousel and Godspell, at Sadler's Wells Theatre in London.

Cowley's television debut was in Neighbours, as Angie Gleason; she went on to film the first season of Merrick and Rosso as Chastity, and appeared with Jimmy Fallon in a 2011 sketch for Universal Studios and the fourth season of Easy to Assemble, created by Illeana Douglas. She also appeared as Cersei Lannister in a 2011 parody of Game of Thrones for G4 (U.S. TV channel).

A noted model, Cowley was the face of Napoleon Perdis "Astro Girl" campaign, Air Tahiti Nui. She was one of the first real models to be used by make-up giant Benefit Cosmetics.

Cowley's on-screen film work has included Get Him to the Greek, Bernard Rose's Two Jacks, Mega Shark Versus Crocosaurus, Ghost Soldiers, Haunting of the Innocent, The Atticus Institute, In The Blood, and Bereave.

Cowley's directorial debut came at the SFC Cannes 2008. Her work was subsequently selected for the St John's International Women's Film Festival 2008. Flame of the West (2008), which she also wrote, produced and starred in, is distributed in North America by Moviola. Her second film, Mere Image (2010) was chosen for the 2010 The Valley Film Festival. She has been an active contributor to literary and cinema magazines since working on an edition of Film Courage, after a screening of Mere Image at the Film Courage Interactive.

Filmography

Film

Television

References

External links

Living people
People from Islington (district)
English ballerinas
English television actresses
English film actresses
English film directors
English women film directors
1981 births